WDAL (1430 AM) is a radio station licensed to Dalton, Georgia, United States, broadcasting a classic hits format. The station is currently owned by North Georgia Radio Group, L.P. The station is also relayed on FM translator W252CR (98.3); this is reflected in its "98.3 The Mountain" branding.

History
The station signed on in 1954 as WRCD, and changed its call letters to WLSQ on September 28, 1987. On June 1, 1995, the station changed its call sign to the current WDAL.

On January 20, 1987, WDAL had a construction permit to increase its daytime power to 5 kW.

References

External links
FCC History Cards for WDAL

DAL
Classic hits radio stations in the United States
Radio stations established in 1954
1954 establishments in Georgia (U.S. state)